Stacey West may refer to:

Stacey West, character in Gavin & Stacey
Stacey West (golfer) in Canadian Women's Amateur